Shenaaz Nanji (born 8 October 1954) is an  Indian Canadian children's and young adult author. She lives in Calgary, Alberta, Canada. Along with her husband, Dr. G. Mohamed Nanji, she is also part owner in Calgary's only free-standing abortion clinic "The Kensington Clinic".

Writing 
Nanji holds an M.F.A. in Writing for Children and Young Adults from Vermont College.

Nanji's novel Child of Dandelions, a book about the expulsion of Indians in Uganda was a shortlisted nominee for the 2008 Governor General's Awards in the Children's Literature category. Her other children's books include Indian Tales, An Alien in my House!, Treasures for Lunch, The Old Fisherman of Lamu, Teeny Weeny Penny and Grandma's Heart.

References

External links
 

Canadian children's writers
Canadian women novelists
Kenyan emigrants to Canada
People from Mombasa
Writers from Calgary
1954 births
Living people
Canadian women children's writers
21st-century Canadian women writers
21st-century Canadian novelists